Teruni was a district of Armenia c. 400–800 and the family that ruled it.

See also
List of regions of old Armenia

Early medieval Armenian regions
Armenian nobility